Voodoo Academy is a 2000 Horror/Fantasy film directed by David DeCoteau and starring Debra Mayer, Riley Smith, Chad Burris, Kevin Calisher, Huntley Ritter, Ben Indra, Drew Fuller,  Travis Sher, and Rhett Jordan.

Plot summary

Young Christopher has just enrolled at the prestigious Carmichael Bible College, managed by the somewhat unusual Mrs. Bouvier. After some unexplained disappearances, Christopher discovers that Mrs. Bouvier and the Reverend Carmichael have some very bad  intentions for the young men of their school. It soon becomes clear that voodoo magic is being used and the boys are the tools with which the college faculty will try to resurrect Satan.

Cast credits
 Debra Mayer ....  Mrs. Bouvier 
 Riley Smith ....  Christopher Sawyer 
 Chad Burris ....  Rev. Carmichael 
 Kevin Calisher ....  Billy Parker 
 Huntley Ritter ....  Rusty Sankervich 
 Ben Indra ....  Mike McCready 
 Drew Fuller ....  Paul St. Clair 
 Travis Sher ....  Sam Vollero 
 Rhett Jordan ....  Blake Godfrey

External links
 
 
  
 Voodoo Academy review at The Science Fiction, Horror and Fantasy Film Review

2000 horror films
2000 films
2000s English-language films
American independent films
Films about size change
Films about Voodoo
Films directed by David DeCoteau
American supernatural horror films
2000s American films